Danny Wayne Darwin (born October 25, 1955), known as the "Bonham Bullet" and "Dr. Death", is an American professional baseball pitcher and coach, who played in Major League Baseball (MLB) for the Texas Rangers, Milwaukee Brewers, Houston Astros, Boston Red Sox, Toronto Blue Jays, Pittsburgh Pirates, Chicago White Sox, and San Francisco Giants, from  through . Over his MLB career, he amassed 171 wins and 182 losses, with a 3.84 earned run average (ERA).

Early life
Darwin attended Bonham High School and Grayson County College. He signed as an undrafted free agent with the Texas Rangers on May 10, 1976. He began his professional career with the Asheville Tourists in Single-A in 1976. He pitched for the Double-A Tulsa Drillers in 1977 and the Triple-A Tucson Toros in 1978. With Tulsa, he was 13–4, 2.41 ERA in 23 starts with six complete games and four shutouts.

Major league baseball
He made his major league debut with the Rangers on September 8, 1978. He pitched two innings of relief in an 11–4 loss against the Oakland Athletics, giving up one run and two hits. On September 24 of the same year, he made his first major league start against the Seattle Mariners. He pitched six innings, giving up eight hits, striking out seven, and allowing only one walk to record his first victory.

Darwin did not become a full-time starter until 1981, a strike-shortened season. He made 22 starts that year, carving out a 9–9 record with a 3.64 ERA.

He pitched almost exclusively out of the bullpen in 1982, but returned to the Texas rotation the following year. He was traded to the Milwaukee Brewers on January 18, 1985, as part of a four-team deal with the Royals and Mets. He made 29 starts for Milwaukee during the 1985 campaign, posting a record of 8–18.

He was traded during the 1986 season to the Houston Astros for Mark Knudson and Don August. He remained with Houston through 1990, gradually being switched from a starting pitcher to a reliever by his last years with the Astros. In his final season in Houston, he was 11–4, 2.21 era in 48 games (17 starts) to win the National League ERA title.

He signed with the Boston Red Sox as a free agent after the season and pitched with them for four seasons, both as a starter and a reliever.

After leaving the Red Sox, he had a shaky season in 1995, starting with the Toronto Blue Jays, but being cut midway through the season (with a 1–8 record and 7.62 era) and signing with the Texas Rangers again.

His return to Texas was short-lived, as he spent the last three years of his career bouncing around between teams. He signed with the Pittsburgh Pirates in 1996, who traded him back to the Astros at mid-season (for Rich Loiselle). Then he signed with the Chicago White Sox in 1997, only to be dealt at the trading deadline to the San Francisco Giants as part of a multi-player deal that sent Wilson Álvarez and Roberto Hernández to the Giants and Keith Foulke, Bob Howry, Lorenzo Barceló, Mike Caruso, Ken Vining, and Brian Manning to the White Sox in what became known as the White Flag Trade. He finished his career in 1998, pitching 1/3 of an inning for the Giants in his final appearance against the Pirates.

Danny's younger brother, Jeff Darwin (born 1969), also had a professional baseball career that lasted eleven years. Jeff, who also graduated from Bonham High School, spent parts of three seasons in the majors, including 1996–1997 with the Chicago White Sox. Both Danny & Jeff were in the White Sox organization in 1997 but Danny was traded on July 31 and Jeff was not called up from the Minors until August 17. In 1998 again they were both with the Giants but Jeff spent the year at AAA and was not called up.

Later life
Darwin is the sponsor of the "Danny Darwin Celebrity Open Golf Tournament" at North Central Texas College.

He was the pitching coach for the Jacksonville Suns in the Double-A Southern League from 2006 to 2007 and the pitching coach of the Class-A Great Lakes Loons from 2008 to 2009 before joining Chattanooga for 2010.

In April 2018, Darwin became interim pitching coach for the Cincinnati Reds, promoted from Double-A Pensacola Blue Wahoos, where he was pitching coach for three seasons.

In January 2019, Darwin was named the pitching coach for the Reds' Double-A affiliate, the Chattanooga Lookouts.

Incidents

Orel Hershiser punch
During a brawl between the Phillies and the Giants, Orel Hershiser claims Darwin punched him in the face. At the time, the two were teammates. Hershiser claimed it was retribution for Hershiser hitting Darwin back when he was pitching against him.

Physical altercation with Barry Bonds
During a game while playing with the Giants, Darwin and Barry Bonds got into a heated argument when Bonds lazily fielded a hit that became an RBI.

See also
 Houston Astros award winners and league leaders
 List of Major League Baseball annual ERA leaders
 List of Major League Baseball career strikeout leaders

References

External links

Danny Darwin at Astros Daily

 Danny Darwin at SABR (Baseball BioProject)

1955 births
Living people
American expatriate baseball players in Canada
Asheville Tourists players
Baseball coaches from Texas
Baseball players from Texas
Boston Red Sox players
Chicago White Sox players
Houston Astros players
Major League Baseball pitchers
Milwaukee Brewers players
National League ERA champions
Oklahoma City 89ers players
People from Bonham, Texas
Pittsburgh Pirates players
San Francisco Giants players
Texas Rangers players
Toronto Blue Jays players
Tucson Toros players
Tulsa Drillers players